The 1981–82 UC Irvine Anteaters men's basketball team represented the University of California, Irvine during the 1981–82 NCAA Division I men's basketball season. The Anteaters were led by second year head coach Bill Mulligan and played their home games at the Crawford Hall. They were members of the Pacific Coast Athletic Association. They finished the season 23–7 and 10–4 in PCAA play.

Previous season 
Under first year coach Bill Mulligan, the 1979–80 Anteaters archived their first winning season as a division 1 program with a record of 17–10 and was 3rd in conference play with a record of 9–5. The anteaters averaged 86.4 points per game and led the country in scoring.

Off-season

Incoming transfers

Source:

1981 recruiting class

Source:

Roster

Schedule

|-
!colspan=9 style=|Non-Conference Season

|-
!colspan=9 style=|Conference Season

|-
!colspan=9 style=| PCAA tournament

|-
!colspan=9 style=| NIT

Source

Awards and honors
Kevin Magee
AP First Team All-American
USBWA First Team All-American
NABC Second Team All-American
PCAA Player of the Year
PCAA First Team All-Conference
Ben McDonald
PCAA Second Team All-Conference
Source:

Team players drafted into the NBA

Source

References

UC Irvine Anteaters men's basketball seasons
UC Irvine
UC Irvine Anteaters
UC Irvine Anteaters